The following is a list of the highest-grossing films in Pakistan, with gross revenue in Pakistani rupees. This is not an official tracking of figures, as reliable sources that publish data are frequently pressured to increase their estimates. For a list of the highest-grossing Pakistani films worldwide, see List of highest-grossing Pakistani films.

Highest-grossing films 

The Legend of Maula Jatt is the highest-grossing film of all time in Pakistan and it was released in October 2022.

This is the list of the top 21 highest-grossing films of all time released in Pakistan. These figures are not adjusted for ticket prices inflation.

Domestic films

Choorian was the first film ever to cross the 20 crore mark in Pakistan and it was released back in 1998.
Jawani Phir Nahi Ani 2 is the first movie to cross the 50 crore mark and The Legend of Maula Jatt  is the first and only movie to cross the 90 crore mark in Pakistan.

This is the list of the highest-grossing Pakistani films within local Pakistani cinemas, which include films from all the Pakistani languages. These figures are not adjusted for ticket prices inflation.

Foreign films

Spider-Man: No Way Home records the biggest opening weekend for any film during the COVID-19 pandemic in Pakistan, third highest for a Hollywood release which grossed nearly 9.2 crore, highest grossing film during Covid-19, and Pakistan is one of the few countries where Spider-Man: No Way Home has managed to surpass the record of Avengers: Endgame to become the highest grossing Hollywood film in the country. Doctor Strange in the Multiverse of Madness released in Pakistan 3 days after Eid al-Fitr when five local films were already running in theaters from Eid Day 1 but still managed to surpass them all. This angered local producers and they demanded a ban on foreign films but the fans' reaction on social media blocked off the protest as the audience was more interested in watching Doctor Strange which later became the highest grossing film of 2022 at the Pakistani box office where it grossed more than 23 crore.

This is the list of the highest-grossing Foreign films released in Pakistan. These figures are not adjusted for ticket prices inflation.

Highest-grossing openings in Pakistan 
This is the list of the highest-grossing opening weekends released in Pakistan. Since many films do not open on Fridays, the 'opening' is taken to be the gross between the first day of release and the first Sunday following the movie's release. These figures are not adjusted for ticket prices inflation.

See also

 List of highest-grossing Pakistani films
 Lists of Pakistani films
 Cinema of Pakistan
 Lists of highest-grossing films
 List of 2022 box office number-one films in Pakistan

References

External links
The History of Lollywood Decade By Decade (1947—present)
Pakistani Movies On IMDb
Best Pakistani Movies On IMDb
Best Bollywood Movies On IMDb 
Best Hollywood Movies On IMDb

Pakistan